The European New Right (ENR) is a far-right movement which originated in France as the Nouvelle Droite in the late 1960s. Its proponents are involved in a global "anti-structural revolt" against modernity and post-modernity, largely in the form of loosely connected intellectual communities striving to diffuse a similar philosophy within European societies.

ENR leaders are generally opposed to liberalism, individualism, egalitarianism, and the nation-state. Endorsing a communitarian and organicist worldview, they advocate the concept of ethnopluralism, which they describe as a global project opposed to multiculturalism where collective identities would coexist peacefully within separated geographical and political spaces. They do not share, however, a standard and collective political agenda regarding the regime or institutions that should be adopted. Instead of seeking direct electoral results, ENR leaders promote their ideas via a common "metapolitical" practice of politics, in order to eventually achieve cultural hegemony and popular adhesion to their ideas.

The European New Right has influenced the ideological and political structure of the Identitarian Movement. Part of the alt-right also claims to have been inspired by Alain de Benoist's writings, arguably the most influential figure of the movement.

History 
The European New Right (ENR) emerged in France from the Nouvelle Droite, an intellectual movement linked to the ethno-nationalist think tank GRECE, established in 1968 by Alain de Benoist and Dominique Venner. The original prominence of the French nucleus has declined over the decades, and the movement now appears in the form of a European network of various groups, parties and intellectuals, all sharing ideological similarities and affinities between each other. Among them are the Neue Rechte in Germany, New Right (defunct) in the United Kingdom, Nieuw Rechts (defunct) and Deltastichting in the Netherlands and Flanders, Forza Nuova in Italy, Imperium Europa in Malta, Nova Hrvatska Desnica in Croatia, or Noua Dreapta in Romania. In Italy, the Nueva Destra emerged from the initiative of a group of young members of the neo-fascist party Italian Social Movement. In the 1980s, de Benoist's ideas were introduced and promoted in West Germany by Neue Rechte philosopher Armin Mohler.

Ideology 
The ENR has gone through several re-synthesis since its emergence in the late 1960s. The last attempt at a common doctrine dates back to the manifesto "The New Right in the year 2000". Its leading ideas were "the critique of liberalism and of the commodification of the world; the rejection of individualism; an attachment to an organicist and communitarian view of society; the rejection of egalitarianism and of the various forms of monotheism from which it arose; the promotion of well-rooted collective identities and of the "right to difference"; the rejection of the nation-state as a form and the promotion of a federalist model that applies the principle of subsidiarity; and a view of international relations based on the idea of a multi-polar world in which Europe would be endowed with its own nationhood, apart from American omnipotence, which is designated the chief enemy of the European peoples."

According to Jean-Yves Camus and Nicolas Lebourg, the core idea of the ENR is their rejection of the "eradication of cultural identities", which has been caused in the ENR worldview by the principles of standardization and egalitarianism inherent to the concept of human rights. Alain de Benoist denounces the "ideology of sameness" as the idea that both commodities and human beings are increasingly seen as identical and interchangeable. According to him, the "greatest" danger in the world at the moment is the "progressive disappearance of diversity from the world", including biodiversity of animals, cultures and peoples. New Right thinker Tomislav Sunić emphasized Oswald Spengler's influence on the ENR, especially his assumption that mankind does not exist as such, that "each culture passes through various cycles", and that the concept of universal history is a non-sense, as there are only a "plurality of histories and their unequal distribution in time and space."

ENR thinkers believe that the West is living in an "interregnum" that will sooner or later give way to a new era in which their worldview would thrive. According to Roger Griffin, they developed, in response to this apparent post-fascist "parenthesis", a worldview founded on a "maze-way re-synthesis" of old and new ideological and ritual elements, combined in a "palingenetic metanarrative". The current political order is portrayed as needing to be abandoned or purged of its impurity, so that the "redemptive community" can leave the phase of liminal crisis to usher in the new era. Additionally, ENR leaders frequently invoke a legendary and mythical past they want to symbolically re-ground in the new society about to emerge, not in a spirit of nostalgia for the return of an ancient golden age, but rather "to create a rooted futurity, a new reality re-established on firm metaphysical foundations." This idea is particularly embodied in the concept of archeofuturism promoted by Guillaume Faye.

Some ENR thinkers, who belong to the Völkisch leaning of the movement, highlight race and ethnicity as the core dimensions of their concept of "identity". This has led to violent rejection of "difference", Faye calling for a "total ethnic war", and Pierre Vial for an "ethnic revolution" and a "war of liberation".

Critics 
Roger Griffin and Tamir Bar-On argue that the ENR is at the origin of a subtle strategy to reinvent the general framework of fascism while preserving the original fascist world view and ideas. They compare the metapolitical stance of ENR leaders to the strategy advocated by neo-fascist thinker Maurice Bardèche in his 1961 book What is Fascism?, where he averred that fascism could survive the 20th century in a new guise:
According to historian Roger Woods, Neue Rechte philosopher Armin Mohler "illustrates the New Right tendency to separate what it regards as a pure version of fascism from the various attempts to put it into practice. He uncouples what he calls 'fascist style' from historical fascism, and on the basis of this distinction declares: 'I am a fascist'".

See also 

 Alt-right
 Neue Rechte
 Nouvelle Droite
 Radical right (Europe)

References

Bibliography

Primary sources 

 
 

 
Far-right politics in Europe
Right-wing politics in Europe
Pan-European nationalism
Political movements in Europe